Hydroxysteroid dehydrogenases (HSDs) are a group of alcohol oxidoreductases that catalyze the dehydrogenation of hydroxysteroids. These enzymes also catalyze the reverse reaction, acting as ketosteroid reductases (KSRs).

There are four types, classified by the number of the position acted upon:

See also
 Steroidogenic enzyme
 Steroid hydroxylase

External links
 

EC 1.1.1